Dr. B.R. Ambedkar University of Social Sciences (BRAUSS) is a state university located in Mhow, Madhya Pradesh, India. It was established in 2016 by the Government of Madhya Pradesh under the Dr. B.R. Ambedkar University of Social Sciences Act, 2015 to focus on education of social sciences, the first such university in India. The university is named after B. R. Ambedkar.

References

External links
 

Social science institutes
Universities in Madhya Pradesh
Universities and colleges in Indore
Educational institutions established in 2016
2016 establishments in Madhya Pradesh
Universities and colleges in Mhow